City Central Park also known as  (VMRDA City Central Park)  is an urban park in the city of Visakhapatnam. The park is located at the heart of the city. This park has the first musical fountain of Andhra Pradesh state. It comes under the maintenance and operated by Visakhapatnam Metropolitan Region Development Authority.

See also 
Dwaraka Nagar

References

External links
 

Parks in Visakhapatnam
2016 establishments in India
Tourist attractions in Visakhapatnam
Uttarandhra